Hugh McLean may refer to:

 Hubert McLean (1907–1997), New Zealand rugby union player, known as Hugh McLean
 Hugh Havelock McLean (1854–1938), Canadian soldier, politician and Lieutenant Governor of New Brunswick
 Hugh McLean (cricketer) (1864–1915), Australian cricketer
 Hugh McLean (Slavicist) (1925-2017), Slavic literature scholar
 Hugh McLean (organist) (1930–2017), Canadian organist 
 Hugh McLean (footballer) (born 1952), Scottish footballer